Gymnosporangium is a genus of heteroecious plant-pathogenic fungi which alternately infect members of the family Cupressaceae, primarily species in the genus Juniperus (junipers), and members of the family Rosaceae in the subfamily Amygdaloideae (apples, pears, quinces, shadbush, hawthorns, rowans and their relatives). The common name cedar-apple rusts has been used for these fungi. According to the Dictionary of the Fungi (10th edition, 2008), there are about 57 species in the genus.

In junipers (the primary hosts, see photo), some species form a ball-like gall about 2–4 cm in diameter which produces a set of orange tentacle-like spore tubes called telial horns. These horns expand and have a jelly like consistency when wet. In other species, such as in G. clarvariforme, the telia are produced directly from the bark of the juniper with no obvious gall formation or swelling. The basidiospores are released and travel on the wind until they infect an apple, pear, hawthorn or suitable tree. 

On the secondary hosts, the fungus produces yellowish depressions on the leaves. It also infects the fruit, which grows whitish tubes like a Medusa head. These are the spore tubes. These aeciospores must then infect a juniper to complete the life cycle. All the types of spores can spread over long distances.

The fungus does not cause serious damage to junipers, but apple and pear trees can suffer serious loss of fruit production due to the effects of the fungus. Although the genus has a worldwide distribution, its impact depends on availability of its two host plant species. Individual species are found in Northern and Central America, Asia, Europe and the Middle East.

Due to the economic impacts of the rusts in some areas where orchards are of commercial importance, some regions have attempted to ban the planting of and/or eradicate the coniferous hosts.

Selected species
{| class="wikitable"
!align="left"|Species
!align="left"|Primary host
!colspan=1|Secondary host
!colspan=1|Common name
|-
|Gymnosporangium amelanchieris
| Juniperus sect. Juniperus
| Amelanchier
|-
|Gymnosporangium clavariiforme
| Juniperus sect. Juniperus
| Amelanchier, Crataegus, Pyrus
| Tongues of Fire
|-
|Gymnosporangium clavipes
| Juniperus
| Crataegus, Cydonia
| Cedar-quince rust, quince rust
|-
|Gymnosporangium confusum
| Juniperus
| Crataegus, Cydonia, Mespilus, Pyrus
|-
|Gymnosporangium cornutum
| Juniperus sect. Juniperus| Sorbus subgen. Sorbus| Mountain ash juniper rust
|-
|Gymnosporangium cupressi| Cupressus| Amelanchier|-
|Gymnosporangium dobroznakovii| Juniperus sect. Juniperus| Pyrus|-
|Gymnosporangium fuscum (syn. G. sabinae)
| Juniperus sect. Sabina| Pyrus| Pear rust, European pear rust, or pear trellis rust
|-
|Gymnosporangium fusisporum| Juniperus sect. Sabina| Cotoneaster|-
|Gymnosporangium gaeumannii| Juniperus communis| (not known)
|-
|Gymnosporangium globosum| Juniperus| Crataegus| Cedar-hawthorn rust, American hawthorn rust
|-
|Gymnosporangium gracile| Juniperus| Amelanchier, Crataegus, Cydonia|-
|Gymnosporangium harknessianum| Juniperus| Amelanchier|-
|Gymnosporangium inconspicuum| Juniperus| Amelanchier|-
|Gymnosporangium juniperi-virginianae| Juniperus| Malus| Cedar-apple rust
|-
|Gymnosporangium kernianum| Juniperus| Amelanchier| Kern's pear rust
|-
|Gymnosporangium libocedri| Calocedrus| Amelanchier| Pacific Coast pear rust, Incense cedar broom rust
|-
|Gymnosporangium malyi| (not known)
| Crataegus|-
|Gymnosporangium multiporum| Juniperus| (not known)
|-
|Gymnosporangium nelsonii| Juniperus| Amelanchier| Witches broom rust, Rocky Mountain pear
|-
|Gymnosporangium nidus-avis| Juniperus sect. Sabina| Crataegus, Cydonia, Malus| Juniper witches' broom rust
|-
|Gymnosporangium sabinae| Juniperus| Pyrus, Malus, Crataegus| Pear rust, European pear rust, or pear trellis rust
|-
|Gymnosporangium torminalis-juniperinum| Juniperus sect. Juniperus| Sorbus torminalis|-
|Gymnosporangium tremelloides| Juniperus sect. Juniperus| Cydonia, Malus, Sorbus|-
|Gymnosporangium yamadae| Juniperus| Malus| Japanese apple rust
|}

References

 Phillips, D.H., & Burdekin, D.A. (1992). Diseases of Forest and Ornamental Trees. Macmillan.
 Scharpf, R.F., ed. (1993). Diseases of Pacific Coast Conifers. USDA Forest Service Agricultural Handbook 521.

External links

 Forestry Images: Gymnosporangium
 Photo of Gymnosporangium sabinae on Juniperus sabina''

Basidiomycota genera
Pucciniales